Three Sisters Springs are located on the Crystal River, in Citrus County, Florida, United States, at . They are in a natural inlet on the east side of Kings Bay. They contain three spring areas that contain many sand boils and vents. The land surrounding the springs is privately owned property and there is no landfall or boat tie-up permitted; the only access to the springs is blocked by concrete posts to stop the boats from entering. Only kayaks, canoes, and swimmers are permitted in the area. Three Sisters Springs is also home to many manatees and is one of the Crystal River's sanctuaries.

Three Sisters springs is also accessible by land. The property around Three Sisters was acquired in 2010 and is open to the public from November 15 through March 31.

In adherence to the mission of protecting and preserving the manatee and its habitat, the areas around the springs have been designated as manatee sanctuaries and are closed to vessels from November 15 through March 31. However, swimmers are able to enter the spring from the water during this time with possible periodic discretionary closures due to manatee behavior. Visitors can view the manatees in their natural setting from land by use of the observation boardwalk overlooking the spring. Many dive shops and marinas in the city of Crystal River offer manatee tours and cater to the needs of divers and snorkelers.

See also
Homosassa Springs Wildlife State Park

References

Bodies of water of Citrus County, Florida
Springs of Florida